The Regio League (RL) is the amateur championship of ice hockey in Switzerland. Organized by the Swiss Ice Hockey Association, it consists of the 1. Liga, 2. Liga, 3. Liga, and 4. Liga, which make up the 4th, 5th, 6th and 7th levels of Swiss ice hockey respectively.

External links
Official website

Ice hockey leagues in Switzerland